Actinoalloteichus is a genus in the phylum Actinomycetota (Bacteria).

Etymology

Species
The genus contains four species:
 A. caeruleus (Baldacci 1944) Teo et al. 2021

 "A. fjordicus" Nouioui et al. 2017
 A. hoggarensis Boudjelal et al. 2015
 A. hymeniacidonis Zhang et al. 2006 (New Latin genitive case noun hymeniacidonis, of Hymeniacidon, the generic name of the marine sponge Hymeniacidon perleve, the source of the type strain.)
 A. nanshanensis Xiang et al. 2011 (New Latin masculine gender adjective nanshanensis, of or pertaining to the Nanshan Temple in Guangxi Province in south China, from where the sample was collected.)
 A. spitiensis Singla et al. 2005 (New Latin masculine gender adjective spitiensis, pertaining to Spiti Valley, located in the Indian Himalayas, where the type strain was isolated.)

See also
 Bacterial taxonomy
 Microbiology

References

Bacteria genera
Pseudonocardiales